Fiji has experienced many coups recently, in 1987, 2000, and 2006. Fiji has been suspended various times from the Commonwealth of Nations, a grouping of mostly former British colonies. It was readmitted to the Commonwealth in December 2001, following the parliamentary election held to restore democracy in September that year, and has been suspended again because of the 2006 coup, but has been readmitted a second time after the 2014 election. Other Pacific Island governments have generally been sympathetic to Fiji's internal political problems and have declined to take public positions.

Fiji became the 127th member of the United Nations on 13 October 1970, and participates actively in the organization. Fiji's contributions to UN peacekeeping are unique for a nation of its size. A nation with a population of less than one million, it maintains nearly 1,000 soldiers overseas in UN peacekeeping missions, mainly in the Middle East.

Since Fiji's independence, the country has been a leader in the South Pacific region, and has played a leading role in the formation of the South Pacific Forum. Fiji has championed causes of common interest to Pacific Island countries.

Since 2005, Fiji has become embroiled in a number of disagreements with other countries, including Australia, China, New Zealand, South Korea, the United States, and Vanuatu.

The country's foreign relations and diplomatic missions are maintained by its Ministry of Foreign Affairs and International Cooperation.

Diplomatic relations list

List of countries which have established diplomatic relations with Fiji:
 – 8 March 1970
 – August 1970
 – 10 October 1970
 – 10 October 1970
 – 10 October 1970
 – 10 October 1970
 – 10 October 1970
 – 10 October 1970
 – 15 October 1970
 – January 1971
 – 22 July 1971
 – 30 November 1971
 – February 1972
 – 1 September 1972
 – September 1972
 – September 1972
 – 10 October 1972
 – 13 October 1972
 – December 1972
 – 1972
 – 10 April 1973
 – 1 August 1973
 – 18 December 1973
 – 30 January 1994
 – 1974
 – 1974
 – 10 November 1974
 – 14 April 1975
 – 30 April 1975
 – 14 May 1975
 – 15 August 1975
 – 1 September 1975
 – 1 September 1975
 – 16 September 1975
 – 5 November 1975
 – 17 November 1975
 – 15 March 1976
 – 10 December 1976
 – 18 January 1977
 – 21 February 1977
 – 1 December 1977
 – 1977
 – 24 February 1978
 – 28 July 1978
 – 3 April 1979
 – 11 December 1979
 – 30 July 1980
 – 20 October 1981
 – Before 1982
 – Before 1982
– Before 1982
 – 1983
 – 12 June 1986
 – 4 December 1986
 – 10 September 1987
 – 22 January 1988
 – 15 March 1988
 – 27 May 1989
 – 1989
 – 22 May 1992
 – 14 May 1993
 – 7 November 1994
 – 8 July 1996
 – 17 July 1996
 – 17 September 1996
 – 29 November 1996
 – 14 July 1997
 – 1 December 1997
 – 19 February 2002
 – 14 March 2002
 – 22 August 2002
 – 11 March 2003
 – 2 September 2003
 – 28 September 2005
 – 16 February 2006
 – 2006
 – 17 September 2007
 – 27 September 2007
 – 8 February 2008
 – 7 March 2008
 – 14 July 2008
 – 15 March 2010
 – 17 March 2010
 – 18 March 2010
 – 29 March 2010
 – 12 April 2010
 – 20 April 2010
 – 10 May 2010
 – 26 May 2010
 – 27 May 2010
 – 2 June 2010
 – 4 June 2010
 – 7 June 2010
 – 15 June 2010
 – 15 June 2010
 – 16 June 2010
 – 19 June 2010
 – 23 June 2010
 – 12 July 2010
 – 20 July 2010
 – 27 August 2010
 – 16 September 2010
 – 21 September 2010
 – 25 September 2010
 – 20 October 2010
 – 29 October 2010
 – Established after 1993 and November 2010
 – 7 December 2010
 – 22 December 2010
 – 23 December 2010
 – 6 January 2011
 – 28 January 2011
 – 7 March 2011
 – 25 April 2011
 – 11 May 2011
 – 18 May 2011
 – 31 May 2011
 – 25 June 2011
 – 28 June 2011
 – 16 September 2011
 – 6 October 2011
 – 15 November 2011
 – 18 November 2011
 – 19 November 2011
 – 21 November 2011
 – 2 April 2012
 – 6 June 2012
 – 30 August 2012
 – 21 September 2012
 – 25 September 2012
 – 12 October 2012
 – 16 October 2012 
 – 9 November 2012
 – 15 November 2012
 – 6 December 2012
 – 22 January 2013
 – 12 February 2013
 – 15 March 2013
 – 15 March 2013
 – 15 April 2013
 – 4 August 2013
 – 13 September 2013
 – 16 September 2013
 – 23 September 2013
 – 27 September 2013
 – 25 October 2013
 – 7 November 2013
 – 13 November 2013
 – 22 November 2013
 – 9 January 2014
 – 24 January 2014
 – 14 February 2014
 – 21 March 2014
 – 4 April 2014
 – 10 April 2014
 – 2 May 2014
 – 16 May 2014
 – 6 June 2014
 – 30 June 2014
 – 7 July 2014
 – 11 July 2014
 – 12 August 2014
 – 9 September 2014
 – 24 October 2014
 – 8 December 2014
 – 11 December 2014
 – 6 February 2015
 – 20 February 2015
 – 30 February 2015
 – 20 March 2015
 – 24 March 2015
 – 2 April 2015
 – 23 June 2015
 – 4 August 2015
 – 4 August 2015
 – 26 September 2015
 – 27 January 2016
 – 18 March 2016
 – 26 May 2016
 – 19 June 2017
Non-UN members which Fiji maintains diplomatic relations:

 – Established, date unknown
 – 12 September 1978
 – 14 July 1998
 – 13 February 2013

Bilateral relations

Fijian missions abroad 

Fiji maintains direct diplomatic or consular relations with countries with historical, cultural, or trading ties to Fiji; Ambassadors stationed in such countries are often accredited to neighbouring countries. Fiji maintains embassies in Belgium (taking care of Fiji's relations with the entire European Union), China, Japan, South Korea, and the United States; and High Commissions in Australia, India, Malaysia, Papua New Guinea, the United Kingdom and New Zealand (in keeping with the Commonwealth practice of calling missions in fellow-commonwealth countries High Commissions rather than Embassies). Fiji also has a Permanent Mission to the United Nations.

Foreign reaction to Fijian legislation 

Australia and New Zealand have both expressed concern over legislation currently before the Fijian Parliament (as of June 2005), which proposes to establish a Reconciliation and Unity Commission, with the power (subject to presidential approval) to compensate victims and pardon persons convicted of crimes related to the coup d'état which deposed the elected government in 2000.

On 30 August 2005, the then Commonwealth Secretary-General Don McKinnon called on the Fijian government to ensure that the legislation reflected the views of its citizens. He emphasized, however, that the Commonwealth did not have a position on the bill.

Fiji and international organizations 

Fiji plays an active role in numerous international bodies. The South Pacific Forum was largely the brainchild of Ratu Sir Kamisese Mara, Fiji's first Prime Minister. The country has been an outspoken participant many international forums.

Commonwealth of Nations 

Fiji has been a member of the Commonwealth of Nations since it gained its independence in 1970. It was not a member of the Commonwealth between 1987 and 1997 as a result of a republican coup d'état, and was suspended just three years after rejoining between 2000 and 2001 after a military coup, and was suspended after the 2006 coup.

Fiji regained its status as a full member after the Fijian general election in 2014.

Oceania Customs Organisation 

On 1 September 2005, it was announced that the Oceania Customs Organization would relocate to Fiji in 2006. Though located in Fiji, it would be totally independent of the Fijian government and of the Fiji Islands Revenue and Customs Authority (FIRCA), Finance Minister Ratu Jone Kubuabola said, and for the first three years of its presence in Fiji, its secretariat would be financed by the New Zealand government.

World Trade Organization 

Speaking at the 18th Fiji-Australia Business Forum in Sydney on 17 October 2005, Prime Minister Qarase strongly criticized the World Trade Organization, saying that its policies were unfair to small countries like Fiji. "WTO is trying to impose equality of trade in an unequal world," he said, "but for developing countries like Fiji there is no level playing field, just a slippery slope." It would be a long time before Fiji's economy could compete on equal terms with that of more developed nations, he considered.

International Labour Organization 

On 10 January 2006, the Fijian government criticized the International Labour Organization for what it said was the organization's unfair treatment of the Fiji Islands Congress of Trade Unions (FICTU). Labour Minister Kenneth Zinck said the government had received a complaint from FICTU about the ILO's discrimination against it in favour of the rival Fiji Trades Union Congress.

Diplomatic initiatives 

Speaking at the 6th Session of the Permanent Forum on Indigenous Issues in New York City on 23 May 2005, Isikia Savua, Fiji's Permanent Representative (Ambassador) to the United Nations, called for equal recognition of individual and collective rights in national and international policies. He said that Fiji had embodied both concepts in its Constitution, through such provisions as communal voting (giving each elector to vote for two members of the House of Representatives, one from his or her own ethnic group, and the other from any ethnic group).

On 1 September 2005, Prime Minister Qarase announced his intention to ask his Australian counterpart, John Howard, for more favourable market access for Pacific Islands products. He called on Australia and New Zealand to revise the rules of origin under the SPARTECA trade agreement, and reduce the figure from 50 percent to 35 percent, thereby allowing Fiji to export a higher percentage of garments made elsewhere to Australian and New Zealand markets.

On 28 October 2005, Prime Minister Qarase criticized Australia and New Zealand for refusing to grant temporary work permits to Pacific Islanders. He said the two countries were acting unfairly in assuming that such permits would encourage illegal immigration. The Prime Minister claimed that in the absence of such work permits, Pacific Islanders visiting Australia and New Zealand often undertook illegal employment anyway.

See also

 List of diplomatic missions in Fiji
 List of diplomatic missions of Fiji

References 

 
Fiji and the Commonwealth of Nations